USS Harpers Ferry (LSD-49) is the lead ship of her class of landing ship dock of the United States Navy. This warship was named for the town of Harpers Ferry, West Virginia, which, because of the U.S. arsenal there, was an important location during the Civil War. USS Harpers Ferry is assigned to the Navy's "Amphibious Group 1". The homeport of Harpers Ferry is at San Diego County, California.

Harpers Ferrys keel was laid down on 15 April 1991, at the Avondale Shipyards in New Orleans. The ship was launched on 16 January 1993. The vessel was commissioned on 7 January 1995.

Operational history

On 1 September 2002, Harpers Ferry relieved  as a forward-deployed warship based in Japan.  In 2011, the two ships exchanged places again with Harpers Ferry returning to San Diego, California as its homeport.

Following the Cyclone Nargis disaster in Burma in 2008, and during the following "Operation Caring Response" humanitarian aid mission to Burma, Harpers Ferry steamed in Burmese waters from 13 May to 5 June, waiting for the Burmese junta government to allow American aid to be taken to its citizens. During this operation, she was a part of 's expeditionary strike group, which also included  and the guided missile destroyer , 
However, in early June, with permission to enter Burmese airspace and land areas still not forthcoming from the Burmese government, it was decided to withdraw this aid mission and to return this Naval Task Group back to its previously-scheduled operations.

In October 2009, Harpers Ferry participated in humanitarian rescue operations in the Pangasinan province, of the Philippines, following the impact of Typhoon Parma (Pepeng) that caused serious flooding.

In early April 2010, the ship participated in the recovery efforts of the sunken Republic of Korea Navy ship .

This ship was one of several participating in disaster relief after the 2011 Tōhoku earthquake and tsunami.

In December 2020 the U.S. Navy's Report to Congress on the Annual Long-Range Plan for Construction of Naval Vessels stated that the ship was planned to be placed Out of Commission in Reserve in 2024.

References

External links 

 
 

Harpers Ferry-class dock landing ships
Amphibious warfare vessels of the United States
Harpers Ferry, West Virginia
Ships built in Bridge City, Louisiana
1993 ships